19139 Apian, provisional designation , is a bright background asteroid from the central regions of the asteroid belt, approximately 6 kilometers in diameter. It was discovered on 6 April 1989, by German astronomer Freimut Börngen at the Karl Schwarzschild Observatory in Tautenburg, Eastern Germany. The asteroid was named for medieval German humanist Petrus Apianus.

Orbit and classification 

Apian is a non-family asteroid from the main belt's background population. It orbits the Sun in the central asteroid belt at a distance of 2.4–2.8 AU once every 4 years and 2 months (1,516 days; semi-major axis of 2.58 AU). Its orbit has an eccentricity of 0.08 and an inclination of 8° with respect to the ecliptic.

The body's observation arc begins with a precovery published in the Digitized Sky Survey and taken at Palomar Observatory in February 1989, approximately 2 months prior to its official discovery observation at Tautenburg.

Physical characteristics 

The asteroid's spectral type is unknown. Based on its albedo (see below), it is a stony rather than carbonaceous asteroid.

Rotation period 

As of 2018, no rotational lightcurve of Apian has been obtained from photometric observations. The asteroid's rotation period, poles and shape remain unknown.

Diameter and albedo 

According to the survey carried out by the NEOWISE mission of NASA's Wide-field Infrared Survey Explorer, Apian measures 5.643 kilometers in diameter and its surface has an albedo of 0.265.

Naming 

This minor planet was named after Petrus Apianus (1495–1552), also known as Peter Apian, a German mathematician and cartographer, who also built astronomical instruments. He is best known for his sky atlas Astronomicum Caesareum published in 1540. The lunar crater Apianus was also named in his honor.

The approved naming citation was published by the Minor Planet Center on 20 November 2002.

References

External links 
 Asteroid Lightcurve Database (LCDB), query form (info )
 Dictionary of Minor Planet Names, Google books
 Asteroids and comets rotation curves, CdR – Observatoire de Genève, Raoul Behrend
 Discovery Circumstances: Numbered Minor Planets (15001)-(20000) – Minor Planet Center
 
 

019139
Discoveries by Freimut Börngen
Named minor planets
19890406